Nguyễn Nhữ Soạn (1391 - 1448), courtesy name Thủ Trung, pseudonym Hiền Đức, posthumous name Hiền-đức Mister, was an Annamese official.

Biography
Nguyễn Nhữ Soạn was born in 1391 at Mệ village, Cự Nạp commune, Đông Sơn prefect, Thanh Hóa region of Trần era. He was the second son of official Nguyễn Ứng Long with second spouse Nhữ Thị Ái.

His full posthumous name was "".

Family
 Father : Nguyễn Ứng Long
 Mother : Nhữ Thị Ái (courtesy name Ngọc Hoàn)
 Younger brother : Nguyễn Nhữ Trạch
 First spouse Nguyễn Thị Tài (from Lam Sơn) who gave birth to Nguyễn Nhữ Trực
 Second spouse Nguyễn Thị Chũy who gave birth to Nguyễn Nhữ Ngộ
 Third spouse Chu Thị Triều who gave birth to Nguyễn Nhữ Lương

See also
 Nguyễn Trãi
 Nguyễn Nhữ Lãm
 Nguyễn Nhữ Trạch
 Trần Nguyên Hãn
 Ngô Sĩ Liên

References

 Temple of Mr. Nguyễn Hiền Đức

1391 births
1448 deaths
People from Thanh Hóa province
Lê dynasty officials